Mika Kurihara Fujitaka (栗原 三佳, born  14 May 1989) is a Japanese basketball player. She represented Japan in the basketball competition at the 2016 Summer Olympics.

Personal
She tied the knot to Soichiro Fujitaka, a professional basketball player for the Osaka Evessa in 2017.

References

External links

Japanese women's basketball players
Basketball players at the 2016 Summer Olympics
Olympic basketball players of Japan
1989 births
Living people
Shooting guards
Sportspeople from Osaka